Gyan Devi Group of Schools is a group of schools, all located in Gurgaon, Haryana, India. The group of schools was made by Mr. Joginder Singh Yadav, the Chairman and Managing Director of all the schools. The schools' motto is "Wisdom is Glory", which clearly highlights the mission of the school, i.e. to spread the light of Wisdom.

Foundation 
All the schools were founded by Mr. Joginder Singh Yadav in the memory of Lt. Smt. Gyana Devi.

Branches 
There are four branches of this group of schools:

 Gyan Devi Public School in Sector-17 A, Gurgaon, Haryana, India.
 Gyan Devi Montessori School in Sector-10, Gurgaon, Haryana, India.
 Gyan Devi School in Sector-9, Gurgaon, Haryana, India.
 Gyan Abhiyan Kendra in Sector-17, Gurgaon, Haryana, India.

References

External links
 http://www.gyandevi.com/ The Official Gyan Devi Group of Schools' Website

Schools in Gurgaon